Attenborough's Journey is a 2010 British documentary on David Attenborough's career as a broadcaster and the production of the nature documentary series First Life. The documentary is presented by David Attenborough, and was made as a prelude to First Life.

Reception
Tim Dowling, of The Guardian, praised the documentary, writing that it showed the "remarkable extent to which Attenborough is, behind the scenes, all one might have hoped: charming, funny, engaging, uncomplaining, extraordinarily well-informed and pleasant without being too nice."

References

BBC television documentaries
David Attenborough